Chwalimie  is a village in the administrative district of Gmina Okonek, within Złotów County, Greater Poland Voivodeship, in west-central Poland.

Before 1648 the area was part of Duchy of Pomerania, 1648-1945 Prussia and Germany. For more on its history, see History of Pomerania.

The village has a population of 120.

References

Chwalimie